The 13245/46  is the Express trains belonging to East Central Railway zone that runs between New Jalpaiguri and  in India. It is operated with 13245/46 train numbers on three days each week.

Halts 

The important halts of the train are:

WEST BENGAL
   
 
 BIHAR'''

Coach composition

The train has LHB coach. The train consists of 23 coaches:

 1 AC First Cum 2 Ac-class (1AC+2AC)
 4 AC II Tier (2AC)
 4 AC III Tier (3AC)
 1 AC III Economy (3E)
 8 Sleeper Coaches (SL)
 3 General (UR)
 2 EOG Rake (EOG)

Traction

The train is hauled by a -based WDP-4 / WDP-4B / WDP-4D locomotive from  NJP to KIR. From KIR to RJPB it is hauled by an Electric Loco Shed, Gomoh-based WAP-7 locomotive and vice versa.

Rake sharing

 13245 / 13246 [New Jalpaiguri-Rajendra Nagar Terminal Capital Express] shares its rake with 13247 / 13248 [Kamakhya Junction–Rajendra Nagar Terminal Capital Express].

References

Transport in Patna
Transport in Siliguri
Transport in Jalpaiguri
Named passenger trains of India
Rail transport in West Bengal
Rail transport in Bihar
Express trains in India